Tarsus may refer to:

Biology
Tarsus (skeleton), a cluster of articulating bones in each foot
Tarsus (eyelids), elongated plate of dense connective tissue in each eyelid
The distal segment of an arthropod leg  see Arthropod tarsus
The lower leg of a bird, also known as tarsometatarsus

Places
Tarsus, Mersin, ancient and modern city in Turkey (former region of Cilicia)
Tarsus (West Syriac Diocese), a Syrian Orthodox archdiocese, attested between the seventh and thirteenth centuries
Tarsus Waterfall, on the outskirts of the city
Berdan River, also known as the Tarsus River, which flows past the city
Tarsus (Bithynia), a town of ancient Bithynia, now in Turkey
Tarsus (crater), an impact crater on Mars

Other uses
 Tarsus (1948–1960), a Turkish Maritime Lines ship formerly USS Harry Lee